Schismatorhynchos heterorhynchos is a species of cyprinid of the genus Schismatorhynchos.

References

Cyprinid fish of Asia
Freshwater fish of Asia